The SKGLB-museum is a railway museum in Mondsee in Upper Austria. It shows relics of the 1957 closed Salzkammergut-Lokalbahn (abbreviation: SKGLB) that was a railway line in  gauge track from Salzburg to Bad Ischl with a branch to Mondsee - a town located at the lake Mondsee. The engine shed of the terminal station at Mondsee is the only preserved engine shed of this line. It has been converted to a museum about the line and its history and contains a collection of original vehicles, photographs and a model layout of the SKGLB's Mondsee branch. The line was privately owned firstly by the Bavarian company "Lokalbahn Aktiengesellschaft" known as LAG. This company owned the cog railway from St. Wolfgang to the Schafberg too which is still in operation.

History of the Salzkammergut Lokalbahn
Opening dates:
 08/05/1890 Ischl - Strobl
 07/28/1891 Salzburg - St. Lorenz - Mondsee
 06/20/1893 Strobl - St. Lorenz
 07/03/1897 Ischl Lokalbahnhof - Staatsbahnhof

closed 1957

References

External links
 
 http://www.ooemuseumsverbund.at/de_museum_15_166.html
 :de:Salzkammergut-Lokalbahn

Railway museums in Austria
Museums in Upper Austria
760 mm gauge railways in Austria